Stephanie  is the Grammy-nominated fifth studio album by American R&B/soul singer Stephanie Mills. It was released in 1981 and produced by James Mtume and Reggie Lucas. The album features hit song "Two Hearts" a duet with Teddy Pendergrass. By default, this fulfilled her contract with 20th Century-Fox Records, as the following year, the label was sold to PolyGram Records, which quickly folded it into Casablanca Records, to which Mills' contract was subsequently transferred. Stephanie scored Mills her second nomination for Best Female R&B Vocal Performance at the 24th Annual Grammy Awards in 1982.

Track listing
All songs written by James Mtume and Reggie Lucas except where indicated.
"Winner" - 4:50 	
"Two Hearts" (duet with Teddy Pendergrass) (Tawatha Agee, James Mtume, Reggie Lucas) - 4:44 	
"Don't Stop Doin' What 'Cha Do" - 4:48 	
"Top of My List" (Rodney Brown, Willie Lester) - 3:42 	
"I Believe in Love Songs" - 4:14 	
"Night Games" - 5:47 	
"My Love's Been Good to You" (Howard King, Tawatha Agee) - 4:12 	
"Magic" (Jeffrey Daniel, Stephanie Mills) - 5:07

Personnel
Stephanie Mills - lead and backing vocals
Basil Fearington - bass
Howard King - drums
Reggie Lucas, Ed "Tree" Moore - guitar
James Mtume, Hubert Eaves III - keyboards
Brenda White King, Luther Vandross, Ullanda McCullough, Tawatha Agee - backing vocals
Technical
Jim "Doc" Dougherty - engineer
Gerry Block, Jay Mark - additional engineer
Craig S. Michaels, Matthew Weiner - assistant engineer
Eugene Bianco - horns and strings contractor

Charts

Singles

References

External links
Stephanie review at Allmusic

1981 albums
Stephanie Mills albums
20th Century Fox Records albums
RCA Records albums